The 2015 EMF miniEuro was the six edition of the EMF miniEURO for national Small-sided football teams, and the fourth governed by the European Minifootball Federation. It was hosted in Vrsar, Croatia, from 21 to 27 September 2015.

The final tournament was contested by 32 teams.

Draw 
The final tournament draw was held in Vrsar on 15 June 2015.

Group stage

Group A

Group B

Group C

Group D

Group E

Group F

Group G

Group H

Knockout stage
The knockout stage matches, which includes quarter-finals, semi-finals, third place play-off and the final, were all played on 25 and 26 September 2015. If a match is drawn after 40 minutes of regular play, a penalty shoot-out is used to determine the winner.

Bracket

Final ranking

References

External links
 Official EMF website 

2015
International association football competitions hosted by Croatia
UEFA minifootball Euro
2015 in Croatian sport
Sport in Istria County